Don't Mess with My Man may refer to:

"Don't Mess with My Man" (Lucy Pearl song), a 2000 song from the album Lucy Pearl
"Don't Mess with My Man" (Nivea song), a 2002 song from the album Nivea